Kowsar is an STM publishing company which was founded in 2002 by S.M. Miri and Seyed-Moayed Alavian. Kowsar journals have been peer reviewed and are published open access under a Creative Commons Attribution License Non Commercial 4.0. The company is a member of the Committee on Publication Ethics.

The publisher has been included in several studies of predatory journals, and was included on Beall's List prior to its shutdown in 2017. In 2018, PubMed Central conducted a re-evaluation of 16 Kowsar journals indexed in the database; 14 were found to "no longer satisfy PMC's Scientific Quality Standard" and were accordingly delisted. Some of its journals, like Anesthesiology and Pain Medicine, incorrectly claimed to be included in the Directory of Open Access Journals. The issue has been resolved in December 2019.

List of journals
The first journal published by Kowsar was Hepatitis Monthly. As of October 2019, Kowsar publishes 49 journals. It has published more in the past. The following journals are or were published by Kowsar.

References

External links

Academic publishing companies
Dutch companies established in 2002
Book publishing companies of the Netherlands